Rendez-vous '87 was a two-game international ice hockey series of games between the Soviet Union national ice hockey team and a team of All-Stars from the National Hockey League, held in Quebec City. It replaced the NHL's All-Star festivities for the 1986–87 NHL season. The Soviet team was paid $80,000 for their appearance in Rendez-vous '87, while the NHLers raised $350,000 for the players' pension fund.

Rendez-vous '87 was designed as a follow-up to the Challenge Cup series in 1979, hoping that the team of NHL All-Stars could beat the Soviet team, unlike before. To this end, the series was a two-game affair instead of a three-game affair in 1979. The two-game series took place during five days of festivities starting on February 9, 1987 and finishing on February 13. The series was very successful, with some, including Wayne Gretzky, calling for more international hockey, especially between Canada and the Soviet Union, the two top powers of hockey at the time. The teams split the games, with the NHL winning the first game, 4–3, followed by a Soviet 5–3 victory two nights later.

Despite the Soviet Union outscoring the NHL team 8–7 on aggregate, Soviet coach Viktor Tikhonov made no claim to victory: "The NHL didn't win and neither did we, the person that won was hockey itself. Both games were like holidays, like festivals, two of the greatest hockey games you'll ever see."

Television coverage
While the telecasts in Canada were on CBC as usual, they were not Hockey Night in Canada productions. The games were done as a CBC Sports production because Molson, which owned Hockey Night in Canadas rights at the time, was not allowed access to Le Colisée in Quebec City. Carling O'Keefe Breweries, owners of the Quebec Nordiques, assumed advertising rights for the telecasts, and the normal host(s) for Hockey Night in Canada in 1987, rookie Ron MacLean and Dave Hodge (before his late-season exit) were replaced by Brian Williams. Even the ice-blue blazers normally worn by Hockey Night in Canada commentators were replaced by the orange CBC sportcoats. Don Wittman and John Davidson called the action for CBC. 

The games were shown in the United States on ESPN, with Ken Wilson and Bill Clement in the booth.

Uniforms
The NHL introduced unique All-Star uniforms to be worn for this series only. The overall design of the white jersey took its cues from the New Jersey Devils' red uniforms, with white replacing the Devils' red, orange replacing green, and black replacing white. The NHL shield was featured on the front, with two black stars to the left and right above the shield, and three additional black stars on each shoulder. The Rendez-vous '87 patch was worn on the right sleeve in lieu of the player number.

The Soviet team wore their standard red national team uniforms with white trim, with the Cyrillic СССР on the front, and team captain Viacheslav Fetisov wearing a "К" for his captain's letter. The players' names on the back, however, were romanized.

Lineups

Game One – February 11, 1987
NHL All-Stars won the game 4–3, thanks in part to the line of Wayne Gretzky, Jari Kurri and Esa Tikkanen. Dave Poulin scored the winning goal on a deflection from Mario Lemieux, but Lemieux was initially credited with the goal. On the bench, Lemieux could be seen pointing toward Poulin as the goal was announced.

 Referee: Sergei Morozov
 Linesmen': Ron Finn, Ray Scapinello

Game Two – February 13, 1987
The Soviets won the contest 5–3. This game featured the emergence of the young Soviet forward line consisting of Valeri Kamensky, Viacheslav Bykov, and Andrei Khomutov. After the game, the players on each team exchanged hockey sweaters as part of the hockey tradition.

 Referee : Dave Newell
 Linesmen : Ron Finn, Ray Scapinello
 Series MVP's, NHL All-Stars Wayne Gretzky; Team USSR Valeri Kamensky

References

External links
 Canada Versus the Soviet Union The heyday of the battle for world hockey supremacy (1972–1987)
 Rendez Vous '87

See also
Ping pong diplomacy
Glasnost

1986–87 in Canadian ice hockey
1986–87 in American ice hockey
1986–87 in Soviet ice hockey
National Hockey League All-Star Games
Ice hockey competitions in Quebec
1987
CBC Sports
1986–87 NHL season
1980s in Quebec City
Sports competitions in Quebec City
February 1987 sports events in Canada
1987 in Quebec